Niobium(V) oxynitrate is a chemical compound with the formula NbO(NO3)3. It is a tetragonal white solid that reacts violently with water to produce niobium pentoxide:
NbO(NO3)3 + H2O → Nb2O5 + HNO3

Preparation
Niobium(V) oxynitrate is produced by the reaction of niobium pentachloride and dinitrogen pentoxide at 30 °C:
NbCl5 + 4N2O5 → NbO(NO3)3 + 5NO2Cl
Nitryl chloride is produced as a byproduct. Attempts to produce this compound by the reaction dinitrogen tetroxide and niobium pentachloride under acetonitrile resulted in the formation of the acetonitrile niobium dioxide dinitrate complex. This compound reacts with water to form niobium pentoxide and decomposes at 65 °C.

References

Niobium compounds
Nitrates